Bergsee is a lake in the Mecklenburgische Seenplatte district in Mecklenburg-Vorpommern, Germany. At an elevation of 62.8 m, its surface area is 0.55 km².

External links 
 

Lakes of Mecklenburg-Western Pomerania
LBergsee